The Chicago City Opera Company was a grand opera company in Chicago, organized from the remaining assets of the bankrupt Chicago Grand Opera Company, that produced four seasons of opera at the Civic Opera House from 1935 to 1939 before it too succumbed to financial difficulties.  It was succeeded by the Chicago Opera Company.

MGM actress Betty Jaynes, at age 15, made her debut with the Chicago City Opera Company on December 6, 1936.

References

 Davis, Ronald L.,  Opera in Chicago, Appleton, New York City, 1966.
 Marsh, Robert C. and Norman Pellegrini, 150 Years of Opera in Chicago, Northern Illinois University Press, Chicago, 2006.

Opera companies in Chicago
Musical groups established in 1935
Musical groups disestablished in 1939